A politician is a person who has political power in the government of a state, a person active in party politics, or a person holding or seeking an elected office in government.

Identity 

Politicians are people who are politically active, especially in party politics. Political positions range from local governments to state governments to federal governments to international governments. All government leaders are considered politicians.

Media and rhetoric
Politicians are known for their rhetoric, as in speeches or campaign advertisements. They are especially known for using common themes that allow them to develop their political positions in terms familiar to the voters. Politicians of necessity become expert users of the media. Politicians in the 19th century made heavy use of newspapers, magazines, and pamphlets, as well as posters. In the 20th century, they branched into radio and television, making television commercials the single most expensive part of an election campaign. In the 21st century, they have become increasingly involved with the social media based on the Internet and smartphones.

Rumor has always played a major role in politics, with negative rumors about an opponent typically more effective than positive rumors about one's own side.

Government job and spoils
Once elected, the politician has to deal with government officers and government employees working for them. Historically, there has been a subtle conflict between the long-term goals of each side. In patronage-based systems, such as the United States in the 19th century, winning politicians replace the government officers and government employees not protected under the government services rules with their supporters. It was the "spoils system". Government job reform was initiated to eliminate the corruption of government jobs. However, in many less developed countries, the spoils system remained in full-scale operation as of 1982.

Careers and biographies
Mattozzi and Merlo argue that two main career paths are typically followed by politicians in modern democracies. First, is career politicians. They are politicians who rule the government sector until retirement. Second, are the "political careerists". These are politicians who gain a reputation for expertise in ruling certain levels of government such as International Governments, Federal Governments, State Governments and Local Governments, then leave politics and start a new business venture  making use of their political contacts.

The personal histories of politicians have been frequently studied, as it is presumed that their experiences and characteristics shape their beliefs and behaviors. There are four pathways by which a politician's biography could influence their leadership style and abilities. The first is that biography may influence one's core beliefs, which are used to shape a worldview. The second is that politicians' skills and competence are influenced by personal experience. The areas of skill and competence can define where they devote resources and attention as a leader. The third pathway is that biographical attributes may define and shape political incentives. A leader's previous profession, for example, could be viewed as of higher importance, causing a disproportionate investment of leadership resources to ensure the growth and health of that profession, including former colleagues. Other examples besides profession include the politician's innate characteristics, such as race or gender. The fourth pathway is how a politician's biography affects their public perception, which can, in turn, affect their leadership style. Female politicians, for example, may use different strategies to attract the same level of respect given to male politicians.

Characteristics
Numerous scholars have studied the characteristics of politicians, comparing those at the local and national levels, and comparing the more liberal or the more conservative ones, and comparing the more successful and less successful in terms of elections. In recent years, special attention has focused on the distinctive career path of women politicians. For example, there are studies of the "Supermadre" model in Latin American politics.

Many politicians have the knack to remember thousands of names and faces. United States Presidents George W. Bush and Bill Clinton were renowned for their memories.

Criticism
Many critics attack politicians for being out of touch with the public. Areas of friction include how politicians speak, which has been described as being overly formal and filled with many euphemistic and metaphorical expressions and commonly perceived as an attempt to "obscure, mislead, and confuse".

In the popular image, politicians are thought of as clueless, selfish, manipulative, dishonest, incompetent and corrupt, taking money in exchange for goods or services, rather than working for the general public good. Politicians in many countries are regarded as the "most hated professionals".

See also 
 Political campaign
 Political party

References

Further reading

 D. Putnam, and Bert A. Rockman, eds., Bureaucrats and politicians in western democracies (Harvard University Press, 1981)
 Heywood, Paul M. ed. Routledge Handbook of Political Corruption (2014) 
 Stebbins, Robert A. From Humility to Hubris among Scholars and Politicians: Exploring Expressions of Self-Esteem and Achievement. Bingley, UK: Emerald Group Publishing, 2017. 
 Stebbins, Robert A. "Democracy’s Politicians: An Occupation Like no Other." Society, 56(5), 461–462, 2019, .
 Welch, Susan, John Gruhl, John Comer, and Susan M. Rigdon. UnGovernment. 8th ed. Belmont: Thompson Wadsworth, 2006

External links 
 Herre, Bastian. 2021. Identifying Ideologues: A Global Dataset on Political Leaders, 1945-2019. 
 
 
 

 
Politician|Political
Legal professions
Positions of authority